Danz is a German surname. Notable people with the surname include: 

 Hailey Danz, American paratriathlete
 Ingeborg Danz, German mezzo-soprano
 Johann Traugott Leberecht Danz (1769–1851), German theologian and church historian
 Luise Danz (born 1917), German concentration camp guard
 Tamara Danz (1952–1996), German singer

Danz is also the nickname of the American musician and producer Danz CM.

German-language surnames